At the 2002 FIFA World Cup, the knockout stage was the second and final stage of the tournament, following the group stage. The top two teams from each group (16 in total) advanced to the knockout stage to compete in a single-elimination tournament. A third place match was also played between the two losing semi-finalists.

Note: Match kickoff times are given in local (South Korea and Japan) time; this is KST and JST (UTC+9) during summer time.

Qualified teams
The top two placed teams from each of the eight groups qualified for the knockout stage.

Bracket

Round of 16

Germany vs Paraguay
Two minutes from the end of regulation time, Oliver Kahn sent a goal kick down the field, which was received by Michael Ballack. Ballack passed to Bernd Schneider whose cross was turned in by Oliver Neuville. In the 92nd minute, Roberto Acuña was sent off after punching Ballack.

Denmark vs England
After five minutes, David Beckham launched a corner towards Rio Ferdinand, whose header was fumbled by Thomas Sørensen into the net. Michael Owen doubled England's advantage after Trevor Sinclair's pass was flicked to him by Nicky Butt. England made it 3-0 one minute before half-time when a throw-in by Danny Mills was missed by Niclas Jensen, with Beckham passing to Emile Heskey who swept the ball home. In the second half, England appeared to take their foot off the pedal, possibly with a view to conserving energy for the next round: but were easily able to snuff out any rare Danish attacks, neither side coming particularly close to scoring again.

Sweden vs Senegal
On 11 minutes, a Sweden corner was headed in by Henrik Larsson. Eight minutes before half-time, Henri Camara equalised for Senegal by shooting into the bottom-left corner. Camara scored the golden goal on 104 minutes, from a similar position shooting low in off the left post. Senegal became the second African nation to reach the quarter-finals, after Cameroon in 1990.

Spain vs Republic of Ireland
Spain took the lead early with a goal from Fernando Morientes. They managed to hold out until the very last minute, when a foul by Captain Fernando Hierro saw a penalty converted by Robbie Keane. After extra time ended goalless, Spain triumphed 3–2 on penalties with goalkeeper Iker Casillas emerging a hero by saving two attempts.

Mexico vs United States

Brazil vs Belgium

Japan vs Turkey

South Korea vs Italy

The 2002 FIFA World Cup round of 16 match between Italy and co-hosts South Korea was played on 18 June in Daejon. In the first round, South Korea had topped their group with victories over Poland and Portugal, and a draw against the United States, while Italy struggled to advance to the second round with a victory against Ecuador, a defeat against Croatia, and a draw against Mexico, while also having several goals ruled out for offside. In the lead-up to the match, the press saw the in-form South Koreans as the favourites to win, in particular as Italy's usual starting defensive pair, Alessandro Nesta and Fabio Cannavaro, were both unavailable – the first due to injury and the latter due to suspension. The pre-game choreography by the Korean fans also saw supporters hold up red and white cards spelling out the words "Again 1966", a reference to Italy's elimination at the hands of North Korea in the first round of the 1966 World Cup. In the fifth minute of play, Ecuadorian referee Byron Moreno awarded a controversial penalty for South Korea after judging Christian Panucci to have pulled down Seol Ki-Hyeon in the box, but Italian goalkeeper Gianluigi Buffon saved Ahn Jung-Hwan's spot kick, putting the ball out for a corner. Italy took the lead in the 19th minute after Christian Vieri headed in a Francesco Totti corner. The second half became increasingly physical, which saw several players on both teams sustain minor injuries, while Gianluca Zambrotta and Kim Nam-Il were later forced off; Seol Ki-Hyeon eventually managed to equalise in the 89th minute to send the match into extra-time. In the first half of extra-time, Italy were reduced to ten men after Moreno showed Totti a second yellow card for an alleged dive in South Korea's penalty area, while Moreno was 40 yards away from the play, and in the second half, Damiano Tommasi appeared to score a golden goal for Italy, but it was ruled out for offside; Ahn later scored the golden goal in the 118th minute to give the co-hosts a 2–1 victory, which allowed them to progress to the quarter-finals of the competition, the first time an Asian team had done so since 1966. Following Italy's elimination from the tournament, Moreno's performance was criticised by members of the Italian team – most notably attacking midfielder Totti and coach Giovanni Trapattoni – for several contentious decisions he had made throughout the match. Some team members even suggested a conspiracy to eliminate Italy from the competition, while Trapattoni even obliquely accused FIFA of ordering the official to ensure a Korean victory so that one of the two host nations would remain in the tournament. FIFA President Sepp Blatter stated that the linesmen had been a "disaster" and admitted that Italy suffered from bad offside calls from the group matches, but he denied conspiracy allegations. While he criticised Totti's sending off by Moreno, Blatter refused to blame Italy's loss on the officials, stating: "Italy's elimination is not only down to referees and linesmen who made human not premeditated errors ... Italy made mistakes both in defense and in attack."

Quarter-finals

England vs Brazil

Germany vs United States

Spain vs South Korea
Co-hosts South Korea faced Spain in the 2002 World Cup quarter-finals on 22 June, in Gwangju. South Korea had progressed to the quarter-finals after defeating Italy with a golden goal, while Spain overcame Ireland in the round of 16 in a penalty shoot-out victory. In the second half of regulation time, Spanish midfielder Rubén Baraja scored from a header, but it was disallowed by referee Gamal Al-Ghandour because of alleged shirt pulling and pushing in the penalty area; a 0–0 deadlock saw the match go into extra-time. In the first half of extra-time, Spanish striker Fernando Morientes appeared to score the golden goal with a header, but the referee disallowed it after the linesman raised his flag, as he erroneously felt that the ball had gone out of play for a goal kick before being crossed in by winger Joaquín; later on in the half, Morientes came close to scoring again when he hit the post with a first-time half-volley following a throw-in. With both sides still failing to score, the match went to a penalty shoot-out; South Korea's goalkeeper Lee Woon-jae saved Joaquín's spot kick – who had been carrying an injury – while South Korea converted all of their penalties – with Hong Myung-bo scoring the decisive spot-kick – to win the shoot-out 5–3, becoming the first Asian side ever to reach the semi-finals of the World Cup. However, following prior criticism in the media over the quality of officiating in South Korea's win over Italy in the round of 16, there was further controversy surrounding the contentious decisions made by the officials in South Korea's quarter-final victory, as the referee had disallowed both of Spain's goals after his linesmen Ali Tomusange and Michael Ragoonath had raised their flags. Spanish midfielder Iván Helguera, who had to be restrained after the match when he attempted to confront the referee, was particularly vocal in his criticism of the officials' decisions, stating afterwards: "What happened here was robbery. Everyone saw two perfectly good goals. If Spain didn't win, it's because they didn't want us to win. I feel terrible about this game."

Senegal vs Turkey

Semi-finals

Germany vs South Korea

Brazil vs Turkey

Third place play-off

Final

References

External links
 Round of 16 results
 Quarter-final results
 Semi-final results

2002 FIFA World Cup
2002
Mexico at the 2002 FIFA World Cup
United States at the 2002 FIFA World Cup
Mexico–United States soccer rivalry
Spain at the 2002 FIFA World Cup
Denmark at the 2002 FIFA World Cup
Brazil at the 2002 FIFA World Cup
Republic of Ireland at the 2002 FIFA World Cup
Italy at the 2002 FIFA World Cup
Germany at the 2002 FIFA World Cup
England at the 2002 FIFA World Cup
Paraguay at the 2002 FIFA World Cup
Sweden at the 2002 FIFA World Cup
South Korea at the 2002 FIFA World Cup
Japan at the 2002 FIFA World Cup
Turkey at the 2002 FIFA World Cup
Senegal at the 2002 FIFA World Cup
Belgium at the 2002 FIFA World Cup